Stare Bojanowo  is a village in the administrative district of Gmina Śmigiel, within Kościan County, Greater Poland Voivodeship, in west-central Poland.

The village has a population of 1,750.

References

Stare Bojanowo